Walteria may refer to:
 Walteria, California, a region of the city of Torrance in southern California
 Walteria (sponge), a genus of animals in the family Euplectellidae